Educational Researcher is a peer-reviewed academic journal that covers the field of education. The editors-in-chief are Carolyn D. Herrington (Florida State University) and Jason A. Grissom (Vanderbilt University). It was established in 1972 and is published by SAGE Publications on behalf of the American Educational Research Association.

Mission Statement 
Educational Researcher (ER) publishes scholarly articles that are of general significance to the education research community and that come from a wide range of areas of education research and related disciplines. ER aims to make major programmatic research and new findings of broad importance widely accessible.

Abstracting and indexing 
The journal is abstracted and indexed in Scopus and the Social Sciences Citation Index. According to the Journal Citation Reports, its 2017 impact factor is 4.00, ranking it 6th out of 238 journals in the category "Education and Educational Research".

References

External links 
 

SAGE Publishing academic journals
English-language journals
Publications established in 1972
Education journals
9 times per year journals